388 Charybdis (prov. designation:  or ) is a very large background asteroid, approximately  in diameter, that is located the outer region of the asteroid belt. It was discovered by French astronomer Auguste Charlois at the Nice Observatory on 7 March 1894. The carbonaceous C-type asteroid has a rotation period of 9.5 hours. It is probably named after Charybdis, a sea monster in Greek mythology.

References

External links
 
 

000388
Discoveries by Auguste Charlois
Named minor planets
000388
000388
18940307